Edmond Poillot, (28 January 1888 – 25 September 1910) was a French journalist, pioneer aviation pilot and amateur boxer. He competed in the men's featherweight event at the 1908 Summer Olympics.

Chief pilot at the Savary's aviation school in Chartres (Eure-et-Loir, France), he died in a plane crash on 25 September 1910, while on a flight with a pupil in the suburbs of the city.

Notes

References

1888 births
1910 deaths
French male boxers
Olympic boxers of France
Boxers at the 1908 Summer Olympics
Place of birth missing
Featherweight boxers